The Passetto di Borgo, or simply Passetto, is an elevated passage that links the Vatican City with the Castel Sant'Angelo. It is an approximately  corridor, located in the rione of Borgo. It was erected in 1277 by Pope Nicholas III, but parts of the wall were built by Totila during the Gothic War.

On at least two occasions it served as an escape route for Popes in danger. Pope Alexander VI crossed it in 1494, when Charles VIII invaded the city and the pope's life was in peril. Clement VII escaped to safety through this passage during the Sack of Rome in 1527, when troops of the Holy Roman Emperor, Charles V, massacred almost the entire Swiss Guard on the steps of St Peter's Basilica.

See also
Index of Vatican City-related articles
Vasari Corridor, Florence
 Passages for Maria Maddalena de' Medici ( the ), also in Florence

References

External links

Curious And Unusual: the Passetto

Buildings and structures completed in 1279
Buildings and structures in Rome
Rome R. XIV Borgo